Albanian folk beliefs and mythological stories comprise the beliefs expressed in the customs, rituals, myths, legends and tales of the Albanian people. The elements of Albanian mythology are of ancient Paleo-Balkanic origin and almost all of them are pagan. Albanian folklore evolved over the centuries in a relatively isolated tribal culture and society. Albanian folk tales and legends have been orally transmitted down the generations and are still very much alive in the mountainous regions of Albania, Kosovo, western North Macedonia, lands formerly inhabited by Albanians like Montenegro and South Serbia and among the Arbëreshë in Italy and the Arvanites in Greece.

In Albanian mythology, the physical phenomena, elements and objects are attributed to supernatural beings. The deities are generally not persons, but animistic personifications of nature. The earliest attested cult of the Albanians is the worship of the Sun and the Moon. In Albanian folk beliefs, earth is the object of a special cult, and an important role is played by fire, which is considered a living, sacred or divine element used for rituals, sacrificial offerings and purification. Fire worship is associated with the cult of the Sun, the cult of the hearth and the cult of fertility in agriculture and animal husbandry. Besa is a common practice in Albanian culture, consisting of an oath taken by Sun, by Moon, by sky, by earth, by fire, by stone, by mountain, by water and by snake, which are all considered sacred objects. A widespread folk symbol is the serpent, a totem of the Albanians associated with earth, water, sun, hearth and ancestor cults, as well as destiny, good fortune and fertility. The cult of the Sun and the Moon also appears in Albanian legends and folk art.

Albanian myths and legends are organized around the dichotomy of good and evil, the most famous representation of which is the legendary battle between drangue and kulshedra, a conflict that symbolises the cyclic return in the watery and chthonian world of death, accomplishing the cosmic renewal of rebirth. The weavers of destiny, ora or fatí, control the order of the universe and enforce its laws. The characters in Albanian tales, legends and myths include humans, deities, demigods, monsters, as well as supernatural beings in the shapes of men, animals and plants. A very common motif in Albanian folk narrative is metamorphosis: men morph into deer, wolves, and owls, while women morph into stoats, cuckoos, and turtles. Among the main bodies of Albanian folk poetry are the Kângë Kreshnikësh ("Songs of Heroes"), the traditional non-historical cycle of Albanian epic songs, based on the cult of the legendary hero. Heroes' bravery and self-sacrifice, as well as love of life and hope for a bright future play a central role in Albanian tales.

Documentation

Albanian collectors 

Albanian myths and legends are already attested in works written in Albanian as early as the 15th century, however, the systematic collection of Albanian folklore material began only in the 19th century.

One of the first Albanian collectors from Italy was the Arbëresh writer Girolamo De Rada who—already imbued with a passion for his Albanian lineage in the first half of the 19th century—began collecting folklore material at an early age. Another important Arbëresh publisher of Albanian folklore was the linguist Demetrio Camarda, who included in his 1866 Appendice al Saggio di grammatologia comparata (Appendix to the Essay on the Comparative Grammar) specimens of prose, and in particular, Arbëreshë folk songs from Sicily and Calabria, Albania proper and Albanian settlements in Greece. De Rada and Camarda were the two main initiators of the Albanian nationalist cultural movement in Italy. In Greece, the Arvanite writer Anastas Kullurioti published Albanian folklore material in his 1882 Albanikon alfavêtarion / Avabatar arbëror (Albanian Spelling Book).

The Albanian National Awakening (Rilindja) gave rise to collections of folklore material in Albania in the second half of the 19th century. One of the early Albanian collectors of Albanian folklore from Albania proper was Zef Jubani. From 1848 he served as interpreter to French consul in Shkodra, Louis Hyacinthe Hécquard, who was very interested in, and decided to prepare a book on, northern Albanian folklore. They travelled through the northern Albanian mountains and recorded folkloric  materials which were published in French translation in the 1858 Hécquard's pioneering Histoire et description de la Haute Albanie ou Guégarie (History and Description of High Albania or Gegaria”). Jubani's own first collection of folklore—the original Albanian texts of the folk songs published by Hécquard—was lost in the flood that devastated the city of Shkodra on 13 January 1866. Jubani published in 1871 his Raccolta di canti popolari e rapsodie di poemi albanesi (Collection of Albanian Folk Songs and Rhapsodies)—the first collection of Gheg folk songs and the first folkloric work to be published by an Albanian who lived in Albania.

Another important Albanian folklore collector was Thimi Mitko, a prominent representative of the Albanian community in Egypt. He began to take an interest in 1859 and started recording Albanian folklore material from the year 1866, providing also folk songs, riddles and tales for Demetrio Camarda's collection. Mitko's own collection—including 505 folk songs, and 39 tales and popular sayings, mainly from southern Albania—was finished in 1874 and published in the 1878 Greek-Albanian journal Alvaniki melissa / Belietta Sskiypetare (The Albanian Bee). This compilation was a milestone of Albanian folk literature being the first collection of Albanian material of scholarly quality. Indeed, Mitko compiled and classified the material according to genres, including sections on fairy tales, fables, anecdotes, children's songs, songs of seasonal festivities, love songs, wedding songs, funerary songs, epic and historical songs. He compiled his collection with Spiro Risto Dine who emigrated to Egypt in 1866. Dino himself published Valët e Detit (The Waves of the Sea), which, at the time of its publication in 1908, was the longest printed book in the Albanian language. The second part of Dine's collection was devoted to folk literature, including love songs, wedding songs, funerary songs, satirical verse, religious and didactic verses, folk tales, aphorisms, rhymes, popular beliefs and mythology.

The first Albanian folklorist to collect the oral tradition in a more systematic manner for scholarly purposes was the Franciscan priest and scholar Shtjefën Gjeçovi. Two other Franciscan priests, Bernardin Palaj and Donat Kurti, along with Gjeçovi, collected folk songs on their travels through the northern Albanian mountains and wrote articles on Gheg Albanian folklore and tribal customs. Palaj and Kurti published in 1937—on the 25th anniversary of Albanian independence—the most important collection of Albanian epic verse, Kângë kreshnikësh dhe legenda (Songs of the Frontier Warriors and Legends), in the series called Visaret e Kombit (The Treasures of the Nation).

From the second half of the 20th century much research has been done by the Academy of Albanological Studies of Tirana and by the Albanological Institute of Prishtina. Albanian scholars have published numerous collections of Albanian oral tradition, but only a small part of this material has been translated into other languages. A substantial contribution in this direction has been made by the Albanologist Robert Elsie.

Foreign collectors 

Foreign scholars first provided Europe with Albanian folklore in the second half of the 19th century, and thus set the beginning for the scholarly study of Albanian oral tradition. Albanian folk songs and tales were recorded by the Austrian consul in Janina, Johann Georg von Hahn, who travelled throughout Albania and the Balkans in the middle of the 19th century and in 1854 he published Albanesische Studien (Albanian Studies). The German physician Karl H. Reinhold collected Albanian folklore material from Albanian sailors while he was serving as a doctor in the Greek navy and in 1855 he published Noctes Pelasgicae (Pelasgian Nights). The folklorist Giuseppe Pitrè published in 1875 a selection of Albanian folk tales from Sicily in Fiabe, novelle e racconti popolari siciliani (Sicilian Fables, Short Stories and Folk Tales).

The next generation of scholars who became interested in collecting Albanian folk material were mainly philologists, among them the Indo-European linguists concerned about the study of the then little known Albanian language. The French consul in Janina and Thessalonika, Auguste Dozon, published Albanian folk tales and songs initially in the 1879  (Manual of the Shkip or Albanian Language) and in the 1881 Contes albanais, recueillis et traduits (Albanian Tales, Collected and Translated). The Czech linguist and professor of Romance languages and literature, Jan Urban Jarnik, published in 1883 Albanian folklore material from the region of Shkodra in Zur albanischen Sprachenkunde (On Albanian Linguistics) and Příspěvky ku poznání nářečí albánských uveřejňuje (Contributions to the Knowledge of Albanian Dialects). The German linguist and professor at the University of Graz, Gustav Meyer, published in 1884 fourteen Albanian tales in Albanische Märchen (Albanian Tales), and a selection of Tosk tales in the 1888 Albanian grammar (1888). His folklore material was republished in his Albanesische Studien (Albanian Studies). Danish Indo-Europeanist and professor at the University of Copenhagen, Holger Pedersen, visited Albania in 1893 to learn the language and to gather linguistic material. He recorded thirty-five Albanian folk tales from Albania and Corfu and published them in the 1895 Albanesische Texte mit Glossar (Albanian Texts with Glossary). Other Indo-European scholars who collected Albanian folklore material were German linguists Gustav Weigand and August Leskien.

In the first half of the 20th century, British anthropologist Edith Durham visited northern Albania and collected folklore material on the Albanian tribal society. She published in 1909 her notable work High Albania, regarded as one of the best English-language books on Albania ever written. From 1923 onward, Scottish scholar and anthropologist Margaret Hasluck collected Albanian folklore material when she lived in Albania. She published sixteen Albanian folk-stories translated in English in her 1931 Këndime Englisht–Shqip or Albanian–English Reader.

Origin 

The elements of Albanian mythology are of Paleo-Balkanic origin and almost all of them are pagan. Ancient Illyrian religion is considered to be one of the sources from which Albanian legend and folklore evolved, reflecting a number of parallels with Ancient Greek and Roman mythologies. Albanian legend also shows similarities with neighbouring Indo-European traditions, such as the oral epics with the South Slavs and the folk tales of the Greeks.

Albanian mythology inherited the Indo-European narrative epic genre about past warriors (Kângë Kreshnikësh), a tradition shared with early Greece, classical India, early medieval England, medieval Germany and South Slavs. Albanian folk beliefs and mythology also retained the typical Indo-European tradition of the deities located on the highest and most inaccessible mountains (Mount Tomor), the sky, lightning, weather and fire deities (Zojz, Perëndi, Shurdh, Verbt, En, Vatër, Nëna e Vatrës), the "Daughter of the Sun and Moon" legend (E Bija e Hënës dhe e Diellit), the "serpent-slaying" and "fire in water" myths (Drangue and Kulshedra), the Fates and Destiny goddesses (Zana, Ora, Fatí, Mira) the Divine twins (Muji and Halili), and the guard of the gates of the Underworld (the three-headed dog who never sleeps).

History
Albanian folklore traces back to Paleo-Balkan mythology including a substrate of Illyrian religion. A number of parallels are found with Ancient Greek and Roman mythologies. In the context of religious perceptions, historical sources confirm the relations between the Greco-Roman religious ethics and the Albanian customary laws. These relations can be seen during the rule of the Illyrian emperors, such as Aurelian who introduced the cult of the Sun; Diocletian who stabilized the empire and ensured its continuation through the institution of the Tetrarchy; Constantine the Great who issued the Edict of Toleration for the Christianized population and who summoned the First Council of Nicaea involving many clercs from Illyricum; Justinian who issued the Corpus Juris Civilis and sought to create an Illyrian Church, building Justiniana Prima and Justiniana Secunda, which was intended to become the centre of Byzantine administration.

Prehistoric Illyrian symbols used on funeral monuments of the pre-Roman period have been used also in Roman times and continued into late antiquity in the broad Illyrian territory. The same motifs were kept with identical cultural-religious symbolism on various monuments of the early medieval culture of the Albanians. They appear also on later funerary monuments, including the medieval tombstones (stećci) in Bosnia and Herzegovina and the burial monuments used until recently in northern Albania, Kosovo, Montenegro, southern Serbia and northern North Macedonia. Such motifs are particularly related to the ancient cults of the Sun and Moon, survived until recently among northern Albanians. 

Among the Illyrians of early Albania the Sun was a widespread symbol. The spread of a Sun cult and the persistence of Sun motifs into the Roman period and later are considered to have been the product of the Illyrian culture. In Christian iconography the symbol of the Sun is associated with immortality and a right to rule. The pagan cult of the Sun was almost identical to the Christian cult in the first centuries of Christianity. Varieties of the symbols of the Sun that Christian orders brought in the region found in the Albanian highlands sympathetic supporters, enriching the body of their symbols with new material.

The historical-linguistic determination of the Albanian Christian terminology provides evidence that Albanians have already joined the process of conversion to Christianity in the Balkans since the late antiquity (4th–5th centuries AD). The earliest church lexicon is mainly of Late Latin or Ecclesiastical Latin origin and, to a large extent, of native origin, which leads to the conclusion that the Christianisation of the Albanians occurred under the Latin-based liturgy and ecclesiastical order of the Holy See. Also according to Church documents, the territories that coincide with the present-day Albanian-speaking compact area had remained under the jurisdiction of the Bishop of Rome and used Latin as official language at least until the first half of the 8th century. After the first access of the ancestors of the Albanians to the Christian religion in antiquity the term Zot – which in the pre-Christian pagan period was presumably used in Albanian to refer to the sky father/god/lord, father-god, heavenly father (the Indo-European father daylight-sky-god) – has been used for God, the Father and the Son (Christ).

At the time of the South Slavic incursion and the threat of ethnic turbulence in the Albanian-inhabited regions, the Christianization of the Albanians had already been completed and it had apparently developed for Albanians as a further identity-forming feature alongside the ethnic-linguistic unity. Church administration, which was controlled by a thick network of Roman bishoprics, collapsed with the arrival of the Slavs. Between the early 7th century and the late 9th century the interior areas of the Balkans were deprived of church administration, and Christianity might have survived only as a popular tradition on a reduced degree. Some Albanians living in the mountains, who were only partially affected by Romanization, probably sank back into the Classic Paganism.

The reorganization of the Church as a cult institution in the region took a considerable amount of time. The Balkans were brought back into the Christian orbit only after the recovery of the Byzantine Empire and through the activity of Byzantine missionaries. The earliest church vocabulary of Middle Greek origin in Albanian dates to the 8th–9th centuries, at the time of the Byzantine Iconoclasm, which was started by the Byzantine Emperor Leo III the Isaurian. In 726 Leo III established de jure the jurisdiction of the Ecumenical Patriarchate of Constantinople over the Balkans, as the Church and the State established an institution. The Eastern Church expanded its influence in the area along with the social and political developments. Between the 7th and 12th centuries a powerful network of cult institutions were revived completely covering the ecclesiastical administration of the entire present-day Albanian-speaking compact area. In particular an important role was played by the Theme of Dyrrhachium and the Archdiocese of Ohrid. Survived through the centuries, the Christian belief among Albanians became an important cultural element in their ethnic identity. Indeed, the lack of Old Church Slavonic terms in Albanian Christian terminology shows that the missionary activities during the Christianization of the Slavs did not involve Albanian-speakers. In a text compiled around the beginning of the 11th century in the Old Bulgarian language, the Albanians are mentioned for the first time with their old ethnonym Arbanasi as half-believers, a term which for Eastern Orthodox Christian Bulgarians meant Catholic Christian. The Great Schism of 1054 involved Albania separating the region between Catholic Christianity in the north and Orthodox Christianity in the south.

Islam was first introduced to Albania in the 15th century after the Ottoman conquest of the area. In Ottoman times, often to escape higher taxes levied on Christian subjects, the majority of Albanians became Muslims. However one part retained Christian and pre-Christian beliefs. In the 16th century the Albanians are firstly mentioned as worshippers of the Sun and the Moon. British poet Lord Byron (1788–1824), describing the Albanian religious belief, reported that "The Greeks hardly regard them as Christians, or the Turks as Muslims; and in fact they are a mixture of both, and sometimes neither." In Ottoman times education in the Albanian language was forbidden. The folk storytellers have played an important role in preserving Albanian folklore. The lack of schools was compensated by the folk creativity, molding generations of Albanians with their forefathers' wisdom and experience and protecting them from assimilation processes. 

Between the 16th and 18th centuries, in Albania arrived also the Bektashi Sufi order which spread widely among Albanians because of its traditional tolerance and regard for different religions, practices and beliefs and because it allowed itself to be a vehicle for the expression of Crypto-Christian, Christian and pre-Christian pagan beliefs and rituals. Bektashism is a Muslim dervish order (tariqat) thought to have originated in the 13th century in a frontier region of Anatolia, where Christianity, Islam and paganism coexisted, allowing the incorporation of comparable pagan and non-Muslim beliefs into popular Islam. It facilitated the conversion process to the new Muslims and became the official order of the Janissaries. After the ban of all the Sufi orders in Turkey in 1925, the Bektashi Order established its headquarters in Tirana. Since its founding in 1912, Albania has been a secular state, becoming atheist during the Communist regime, and returning secular after the fall of the regime.

Albanian folklore evolved over the centuries in a relative isolated tribal culture and society, and although several changes occurred in the Albanian belief system, an ancient substratum of pre-Christian beliefs has survived until today. Ancient paganism persisted among Albanians, and within the inaccessible and deep interior it has continued to persist, or at most it was partially transformed by the Christian, Muslim and Marxist beliefs that were either to be introduced by choice or imposed by force. Folk tales, myths and legends have been orally transmitted down the generations and are still very much alive in the mountainous regions of Albania, Kosovo and western North Macedonia, among the Arbëreshë in Italy and the Arvanites in Greece.

Mythology

Cosmology

Supreme Being
Zojz(-i)/Zot(-i), Perëndi(-a), Hy(-u)/Hyj(-i)

Good and Evil, Cosmic Renewal
Drangue and Kulshedra

Destiny
Fates: weavers of human destiny
Fatí or Mira (among Tosks)
Ora or Zana (among Ghegs)
Vitore/Bolla e Shtëpisë

Sky
 
Qielli (the Sky)
Dielli (the Sun)
Hëna (the Moon)
Afërdita, (h)ylli i dritës / mëngjesit / karvanit (Venus, the morning star)
Yjet (the Stars)
Shenjëzat (the Pleiades)

Earth
Toka/Dheu (the Earth)
Uji (the Water)
Guri (the Stone, the 'heavy' one)
Malet/Bjeshkët (the Mountains)

Phenomena
Reja (the Cloud)
Shkreptima/Vetëtima/Rrufeja (the Lightning and Thunder)
Zjarri (the Fire)

Nature deities

Sky, weather
Zot: sky father (one of the three Albanian names of God)
Zojz: sky, lightning
Perëndi: sky, lightning (one of the three Albanian names of God)
Nëna e Diellit: sun mother
Shurdh: weather
Verbt: weather
Lubia: weather
Stihi: weather
Drangue and Kulshedra: weather
E Bija e Hënës dhe e Diellit: "the Daughter of the Moon and the Sun", lightning of the sky
Prende ('she who brings the light through') or Hylli i Dritës Afêrdita ('the Star of Light Afêrdita'): dawn, rainbow (in Albanian, Friday bears this name)

Earth, vegetation
Toka: living earth; it is believed that water is to the earth what blood is to the humans
Earth goddess–mother goddess
E Bukura e Dheut: the beauty of the earth
Tomor and Shpirag: mountains
Drangue and Kulshedra: earth, stones, trees
Mauthia: earth and mountains
Dhe-tokësi, Dheu or Tokësi: chthonic serpent
Kau: earth and agriculture
Zana: vegetation, mountains
Bariu Hyjnor: mountains, animals
Golden horned goats: wild goats protectors of the forests
Nuse Mali: mountain nymphs
Zana e malit, Ora, Bardha, Shtojzovalle, Jashtësme, Të Lumet Natë, Mira

Burn, fire, hearth
Hy(-u)/Hyj(-i): burn, glow, spark, heavenly fire (one of the three Albanian names of God)
En/Enj: fire (in Albanian, Thursday bears this name)
Verbt: fire-storms, fire-whirls
Drangue and Kulshedra: fire
Stihi: fire
Djalli: fire
Vatër: hearth
Nëna e Vatrës: hearth mother

Water, sea
Uji: water; uji i gjallë: living water; it is believed that water is to the earth what blood is to the humans
Kron-i/krua/kroi: living water, flowing water, water spring
Redon: flowing water, seas
Talas: sea, sea-storms
Shurdh: water, rain
Verbt: water, rain
Lubia: water, rain, seas
Drangue and Kulshedra: water, rain, seas
Bolla: water serpent
Bushi i kënetës: bull of ponds and swamps which can cause rain by bellowing
E Bukura e Detit: the beauty of the sea
Nuse uji: water nymphs
Zana e ujit, Nusja Shapulicë, Cuca e Liqenit, Ksheta, Perria

Societal deities
Prende: lady of beauty, love and fertility
Nëna e Vatrës: the mother of the hearth/fireplace
Vitore/Bolla e Shtëpisë, household golden horned serpent

Sacred animals

Bleta (the Bee, associated with human life: when an animal ceases to live, Albanians predominantly use the verb ngordh; When a bee ceases to live, the verb vdes is used often (which is used to refer to human death). Alluding that bees are beings of a higher caste, comparable to humans.
Dreri (the Deer, associated with sun cult)
Shqiponja (the Eagle – totem of Albanian people – associated with freedom and heroism)
Dhia e egër (the wild Goat, associated with forests cult)
Gjarpri (the Serpent is an animal totem of the Albanians, associated with earth, water, sun, hearth and ancestor cults, as well as destiny, good fortune and fertility)
Bukla (the Stoat)
Ujku (the Wolf)

Concepts

Kanun
Besa/Beja (oath swearing)
me diell (by sun), me dhè (by earth), me zjarr (by fire), me fushë (by field), me gur/gur-rrufeje (by stone/thunder-stone), me hënë (by moon), me mal (by mountain), me qiell (by sky), me ujë (by water), me toks (by snake)
Numbers
Nxiri: all-seing eyes that look at humans from the ground following their movements everywhere, considered to be the sight of the living Earth
Good and Evil
Fate

Fryma, Hija, Shpirti (the Soul)
Rebirth
Animism
Totemism
Ancestor worship
Syri i Keq (the Evil Eye)
Yshtje
Ditët e Plakës (Old Woman's Days, a belief about the last cold days of winter)

Mythical beings

Serpentine dragons
Bolla→Bollar→Errshaja→Kulshedra
Ljubi
Stihi
Sprija
Llamja (half snake, half woman)
Abe (phantom wearing a cloak)

Angu (shapeless ghost who appears in dreams)

Avullushe (spirits that suffocate people with their breath)
Bariu i mirë (the good shepherd)
Baloz (dark knight, huge monster)
Bushtra (bad omen-wishing female witch)
Çakalloz (mighty being, slightly deranged hero)
Dhampir (half-vampire, half-human)
Dhevështruesi (half human and half animal)
Dhamsutë (deaf and dumb mare)
Divi (ogre)
Flama (restless evil ghost)
Gjysmagjeli
Gogol (bogeyman)
Hajnjeri (man eating giant)
Hija (shadow ghost) 
Jashtësme (Elf-like nymphs that live in forests)

Judi (giant ghost)
Kacamisri (similar to Tom Thumb)
Karkanxholl (werewolf)
Katallan (giant), having its origins in the Catalan Company's brutality in the Catalan Campaign in Asia Minor.
Katravesh (the four-eared one, man-eating monster)
Kolivilor (demon similar to an incubus)
Kore (child eating demon)
Kukudh (plague demon)
Lahin (dwarf-like goblin))
Laura (shapeshifting swamp hag)
Lugat (revenant)
Magjí (evil woman, old hag))
Makth (nightmare ghost that suffocates people during sleep)
Pëlhurëza (veil ghost)
Qeros (Scurfhead)
Qose (Barefaced Man)
Rrqepta (similar to a beast)
Rusale (mermaid)
Shtriga (vampiric witch)
Syqeni (the Doggy Eyed, a wizard)
Thopçi or Herri (gnome)
Three headed dog (Cerberus)
Vampir
Vurvolaka (werewolves)
Xhindi (jinn)

Heroic characters
The Albanian terms for "hero" are trim (female: trimneshë), kreshnik or hero (female: heroinë). Some of the main heroes of the Albanian epic songs, legends and myths are:
Demigods
Drangue: semi-human winged warrior, whose weapons are meteoric stones, lightning-swords, thunderbolts, piles of trees and rocks
E Bija e Hënës dhe e Diellit: "the Daughter of the Moon and the Sun", who is described as the lightning of the sky which falls everywhere from heaven on the mountains and the valleys and strikes pride and evil. She is sometimes described as bearing a star on her forehead and a moon on her chest.
Humans
Zjerma and Handa: protagonists of the heroic folktale "The Twins". Zjerma (lit. "fire") was born with the sun in the forehead, while Handa (lit. "moon") was born with the moon in the forehead. They have two horses and two dogs as companions, and two silver swords as weapons.
Muji and Halili, protagonists of epic cycle of the Kângë Kreshnikësh
Gjergj Elez Alia
Little Constantine

Heroic motifs
The Albanian heroic songs are substantially permeated by the concepts contained in the Kanun, a code of Albanian oral customary laws: honour, considered as the highest ideal in Albanian society; shame and dishonour, regarded as worse than death; besa and loyalty, gjakmarrja.

Another characteristic of Albanian heroic songs are weapons. Their importance and the love which the heroes have for them are carefully represented in the songs, while they are rarely described physically. A common feature appearing in these songs is the desire for fame and glory, which is related to the courage of a person.

Rituals

Childbirth rituals
Wedding rituals
Fire rituals (living, sacred or divine fire)
Calendar fires: , associated with the cosmic cycle and the rhythms of agricultural and pastoral life
Livestock fires: , associated with the purification of domesticated animals
Hearth fire: zjarri i vatrës, associated with the cult of the hearth

Weather rituals
Rituals to avert hailstorms (ndalja e stuhisë së breshrit)
Through noise, gunshots and bonfires
Rainmaking rituals
Through ritual processions, dances and songs (Rone or Dordolec)
Vajtim, Gjâmë
Murana (burial mounds of stones, tumuli for the cult of the ancestor / hero)

Festivals
Dita e Verës (Verëza): "The Summer Day", an Albanian spring festival celebrated on March 1 of the Julian calendar (March 14 of the Gregorian calendar). In the old Albanian calendar it corresponds to the first day of the new year and marks the end of the winter season (the second half of the year) and the beginning of the summer season (the first half of the year) on the spring equinox. Another festival of the spring equinox is Nowruz celebrated on March 22.
Nata e Buzmit: "Yule log's night" celebrated about the time of the winter solstice, between December 22 and January 6. In Albanian beliefs it marks the return of the sun for summer and the lengthening of the days.

List of folk tales, legends, songs and ballads

Folk tales

Marigo of the Forty Dragons
For the Love of a Dove
The Silver Tooth
The Snake Child
The Maiden who was Promised to the Sun
The Grateful Snake and the Magic Case
The Jealous Sisters
The Princess of China
The Foolish Youth and the Ring
The Barefaced Man and the Pasha's Brother
The Boy with No Name
Half Rooster
Gjizar the Nightingale
The Snake and the King's Daughter
The Bear and the Dervish
The King's Daughter and the Skull
The Stirrup Moor
The Tale of the Youth who Understood the Language of the Animals
The Maiden in the Box
The Girl who Became a Boy
The Shoes
The Youth and the Maiden with Stars on their Foreheads and Crescents on their Breasts
The Three Brothers and the Three Sisters
The Three Friends and the Earthly Beauty
The Scurfhead
The Boy and the Earthly Beauty
The Twins
The Daughter of the Moon and Sun (version with kulshedra)
The Daughter of the Moon and Sun (version with the king's son)
The Daughter of the Sun
The Serpent
Seven Spans of Beard and Three Spans of Body
The Skilful Brothers
The Tale of the Eagle

Legends

Aga Ymer of Ulcinj
Ali Dost Dede of Gjirokastra
Baba Tomor
Mujo and Halili cycle
Gjergj Elez Alia
Sari Salltëk
Scanderbeg and Ballaban
Shega and Vllastar
The Lover's Grave
Legend of Jabal-i Alhama
Princess Argjiro
Nora of Kelmendi
The Legend of Rozafa
Revenge Taken on Kastrati – a Legend of the Triepshi Tribe
The Founding of the Kelmendi Tribe
The Founding of the Kastrati Tribe
The Founding of the Hoti and Triepshi Tribes

Songs and Ballads

Songs of the Frontier Warriors
At the Plane Tree of Mashkullore
Cham Folk Songs (Song of Çelo Mezani)
Song of Marko Boçari
Constantin and Doruntinë
Eufrozina of Janina
Oh, my Beautiful Morea
Song of Tana
Songs of the Battle of Kosova
The Ballad of Rozafa
The Song Collection of Vuk Karadžić

See also
Albanian folk poetry

References

Bibliography

Further reading 
 

Albanian culture
Albanian folklore
Albanian mythology
Paleo-Balkan mythology
Indo-European mythology